Alonzo H. Pickle (born July 2, 1843) was a Canadian-American soldier and member of the 1st Battalion Minnesota Infantry who fought in the American Civil War and was awarded the Medal of Honor for rescuing a wounded officer from the line of fire during the Second Battle of Deep Bottom. Pickle was a citizen of Minnesota, as his family moved there in 1857.

Alonzo was discharged in 1865, and had four children.

References

1843 births
Union Army soldiers
United States Army Medal of Honor recipients
American Civil War recipients of the Medal of Honor
Canadian-born Medal of Honor recipients
Year of death missing
Pre-Confederation Canadian emigrants to the United States